The Immediate Geographic Region of Alfenas is one of the 10 immediate geographic regions in the Intermediate Geographic Region of Varginha, one of the 70 immediate geographic regions in the Brazilian state of Minas Gerais and one of the 509 of Brazil, created by the National Institute of Geography and Statistics (IBGE) in 2017.

Municipalities 
It comprises 13 municipalities.

 Alfenas    
 Alterosa   
 Areado  
 Campo do Meio 
 Campos Gerais   
 Carvalhópolis    
 Conceição da Aparecida     
 Divisa Nova  
 Fama   
 Machado   
 Paraguaçu    
 Poço Fundo  
 Serrania

References 

Geography of Minas Gerais